Jawahar taluka is a taluka in the Palghar district of Maharashtra.

Thane district
On 1 August 2014,  the talukas of Mokhada, Jawahar, Talasari, Vikramgadh, Wada, Dahanu, Palghar and Vasai were separated from the erstwhile Thane district to form a new district Palghar.

References

Talukas in Maharashtra
Talukas in Palghar district